Hawkins is an unincorporated community in Bannock County, in the U.S. state of Idaho.

History
A post office called Hawkins was established in 1901, and remained in operation until 1922.  The community was named after a pioneer citizen.

Hawkins' population was 40 in 1909.

References

Unincorporated communities in Bannock County, Idaho